Tuparetama is a city  in the state of Pernambuco, Brazil. The population in 2020, according with IBGE was 8,256 inhabitants and the total area is 178.57 km².

Geography

 State - Pernambuco
 Region - Sertão Pernambucano
 Boundaries - São José do Egito    (N);  Iguaraci    (S);  Paraiba state   (E);   Ingazeira and Iguaraci   (W).
 Area - 185.54 km²
 Elevation - 560 m
 Hydrography - Pajeú River
 Vegetation - Caatinga hiperxerófila
 Climate - semi arid - (Sertão) hot
 Annual average temperature - 23.5 c
 Distance to Recife - 377.4 km

Economy

The main economic activities in Tuparetama are based in commerce and agribusiness, especially creation of sheep, cattle, pigss, goats, chickens;  and plantations of beans and corn.

Economic Indicators

Economy by Sector
2006

Health Indicators

References

Municipalities in Pernambuco